Scărișoara may refer to several entities in Romania:

 Scărișoara, Alba, a commune in Alba County
 Scărișoara, Olt, a commune in Olt County
 Scărișoara, a village in Corbasca Commune, Bacău County
 Scărișoara, a village in Cislău Commune, Buzău County
 Scărișoara, a village in Cornereva Commune, Caraș-Severin County
 Scărișoara, a village in Mihăești Commune, Vâlcea County
 Scărișoara Cave, an ice cave in the Apuseni Mountains